Olga Iosifovna Pivovarova (born 29 January 1956) is a former rower who competed for the Soviet Union.

References

External links 
 
 

1956 births
Living people
Russian female rowers
Soviet female rowers
Rowers at the 1980 Summer Olympics
Olympic silver medalists for the Soviet Union
Olympic rowers of the Soviet Union
Olympic medalists in rowing
World Rowing Championships medalists for the Soviet Union
Medalists at the 1980 Summer Olympics